{{DISPLAYTITLE:C7H15NO2}}
The molecular formula C7H15NO2 (molar mass: 145.20 g/mol, exact mass: 145.1103 u) may refer to:

 Emylcamate
 β-Homoleucine, also known as 3-amino-5-methylhexanoic acid

Molecular formulas